Denton is a small village and civil parish on the A428 road about  south-east of Northampton. It has a pub, the Red Lion, a village hall, a Church of England parish church and a primary school.

The villages name probably means, 'farm/settlement connected with Dod(d)a/Dud(d)a'.

The 2001 Census recorded the parish population as 767,
decreasing
to 739 at the 2011 census.

Parish church

The Church of England parish church of St Margaret has 13th-century origins but was mostly rebuilt 1827–8.

The interior of the church is decorated with biblical murals by the Northampton artist, Henry Bird. Plans were made for the works in 1960 and they were painted from February 1975 until the summer of 1976. They are on 16 panels with 31 life-size figures, many based on local people.

References

External links

 Denton Primary School
 Description of St. Margarets

Civil parishes in Northamptonshire
West Northamptonshire District
Villages in Northamptonshire